Stenolechia trichaspis is a moth of the family Gelechiidae. It is found in Kashmir and Sri Lanka.

The wingspan is 9–11 mm. The forewings are white irregularly irrorated fuscous and with the markings blackish-fuscous. There are elongate spots on the costa
towards the base, before the middle, and at two-thirds, as well as a small spot beneath the fold near the base. There are suffused spots representing the stigmata, the plical beneath the first discal. There is also a suffused spot on the tornus and one at the apex, as well as a cloudy blackish dot in the disc towards the apex. The hindwings are pale bluish-grey.

References

Moths described in 1918
Stenolechia